Limmu was an Assyrian eponym. At the beginning of the reign of an Assyrian king, the limmu, an appointed royal official, would preside over the New Year festival at the capital. Each year a new limmu would be chosen. Although picked by lot, there was most likely a limited group, such as the men of the most prominent families or perhaps members of the city assembly.  The Assyrians used the name of the limmu for that year to designate the year on official documents. Lists of limmus have been found accounting for every year between 892 BC and 648 BC.

During the Old Assyrian period, the king himself was never the limmum, as it was called in their language.  In the Middle Assyrian and Neo-Assyrian periods, however, the king could take this office.

References

See also
Eponym list

History of Assyria
Chronology